Trojan.Win32.FireHooker or Trojan:Win32/FireHooker is the definition (from Kaspersky Labs) of a Trojan downloader, Trojan dropper, or Trojan spy created for the Windows platform.  Its first known detection goes back to September, 2015, according to the AVV Trend Micro.

Additional Info 
This Malware requires its main component to successfully perform its intended routine as a .dll-file, by the name xul.dll. The file-size is about 5120 bytes. The file is being dropped by s DNS blocking installer or additional installers bundled with DNSblockers.

xul.dll, which is a known Mozilla Firefox DLL, loads in order to come to action the following APIs from the dll-file:

CERT_GetCommonName
NSS_CMSSignerInfo_GetSigningCertificate
NSS_CMSSignerInfo_Verify
PORT_Set_Error
VFY_VerifyDigestDirect

Other aliases 

 TR/FireHooker.1825 (Avira)
 Trojan.GenericKD.2889803 (Bitdefender)
 Win32/FireHooker.A (ESET)
 Trojan.Win32.FireHooker.a (Kaspersky Labs)

External links 
 Analysis of a file @ VirusTotal

References 

Windows trojans
2015 in computing